Don Wildman is the current host and narrator of Mysteries at the Museum, Beyond the Unknown, Dark Tales with Don Wildman, and Buried Worlds with Don Wildman on the Travel Channel.

He also hosted and narrated Travel Channel's Weird Travels, Off Limits, and Monumental Mysteries.

Early life
Wildman was raised in Pitman, New Jersey, and is a 1979 graduate of Westtown School, a Quaker boarding school located in Chester County, Pennsylvania. He also attended Earlham College in Richmond, Indiana (another Quaker school) and trained as an actor at The Drama Studio in London, England.

Acting

Wildman was originally a stage actor in several production the best known of which was Gross Indecency: The Three Trials of Oscar Wilde.  He also acted in several commercials before finding success with his love of history and mysteries.

Travel Channel

Wildman began working for the Travel Channel in 2003 with Weird Travels, a documentary television show made in the United States about international paranormal destinations. The show aired from 2001 - 2006, but Wildman was only involved from 2003 - 2005.

He continued his work with Travel Channel in 2007 with two shows, The Incurables and Cities of the Underworld, which ended in 2008 and 2009, respectively.

In 2011, Wildman hosted Pompeii: Back from the Dead and he has been working at the channel ever since.

His most successful TV show to date was Mysteries at the Museum which ran from 2011 - 2020. He is currently, as of 2021, not working on any television shows.

Producer

In addition to acting, hosting and narrating, Don also produced Off Limits from 2011 to 2013 for the Travel Channel, a documentary series about historical sites around the United States which are unknown and/or off limits. He also hosted the show. He has not produced anything else to date.

Filmography
This list includes both film and television credits.

Currently, Don Wildman hosts Travel Channel's 'Mysteries at the Museum.' According to an article published by travel channel, "Don Wildman is fast becoming one [of] the most recognizable faces in documentary television."

References

External links
 
 Meet Don Wildman

Living people
American television personalities
1961 births
Earlham College alumni
People from Pitman, New Jersey
Westtown School alumni